Curtis Wise Johnson (born June 22, 1948) is a former American football cornerback in the National Football League. He was drafted by the Miami Dolphins in the fourth round of the 1970 NFL Draft. He played college football at Toledo and high school football for Waite.

Professional career
Johnson was drafted by the Miami Dolphins in the fourth round of the 1970 NFL Draft. He played his entire nine-year career for the Dolphins from 1970 to 1978. For his career he started 111 of 125 games, recording 22 interceptions. Johnson also started in three Super Bowls for the Dolphins, winning two of them.

References

1948 births
Living people
American football cornerbacks
Miami Dolphins players
Toledo Rockets football players
Sportspeople from Toledo, Ohio
Players of American football from Ohio